The State Industries Promotion Corporation of Tamil Nadu Limited (SIPCOT)) is an institution owned by the Government of Tamil Nadu to promote industrial growth in the state of Tamil Nadu.

History 
The SIPCOT was formed in 1971 to promote industrial growth in the state and to advance term loans to medium and large industries.

Functions 
The Functions of State Industries Promotion Corporation of Tamil Nadu Limited (SIPCOT) are:
 Development of industrial complexes/parks/industrial estate in Nallampalli Road growth centres with basic infrastructure facilities
 Establishing sector-specific Special Economic Zones (SEZs); 
 Implementation of Special infrastructure Projects;

SIPCOT Estates 
SIPCOT has established industrial complexes in 16 areas, according to the SIPCOT webpage. These include:
 Bargur
 Cheyyar
 Cuddalore
 Gangaikondan
 Gummidipoondi
 Hosur
 Irungattukottai
 Mappedu
 Manamadurai
 Nilakkottai
 Oragadam
 Perundurai
 Pillaipakam
 Pudukkottai
 Ranipet
 Siruseri
 Sriperumbudur
 Thoothukudi
 Thervoy Kandigai
 Vallam - Vadagai

A new SIPCOT is going to be established in Dharmapuri, Thiruvannamalai, Karaikudi and Manapparai soon.

SIPCOT IT Park is the largest Information Technology Park in Asia, located in Padur, Siruseri, along the IT Corridor, Chengalpattu taluk, Chengalpattu District.

See also
 Industrial and Technical Consultancy Organisation of Tamil Nadu (ITCOT)
 ITCOT Consultancy and Services Limited
Tamil Nadu Small Industries Development Corporation Limited(SIDCO)

References

External links
 SIPCOT main page
 List of SIPCOT industrial projects
 Siruseri SIPCOT IT Park map
 SIPCOT Cuddalore

State industrial development corporations of India
Economy of Tamil Nadu
State agencies of Tamil Nadu
Government agencies established in 1971
1971 establishments in Tamil Nadu